Rainbow Canyon (nicknamed Star Wars Canyon and Jedi Transition) is a canyon inside Death Valley National Park in Inyo County, California, on the park's western border.

From World War II until 2019, it was commonly used by the United States Air Force and Navy for fighter jet training and was frequented by photographers who, from the canyon rim, were able to photograph jets flying beneath them. The canyon rim can be reached from Father Crowley Overlook off California State Route 190.

History, geology, and topography
The canyon was cut from basalt lava flows and lapilli beds of the Darwin Hills volcanoes, which last erupted between two and four million years ago during the Pliocene epoch. Formations of granite and marble (metamorphosed Paleozoic limestone), including calc-silicate hornfels occur below the lava in the deepest parts of the canyon. Other pyroclastic rock is also exposed. This variety of material created walls of reds, grey, and pink that are similar to the fictional Star Wars planet Tatooine. As a result, the canyon is nicknamed Star Wars Canyon. Hundreds of petroglyphs from the Coso people who once inhabited the area can be found in the canyon. Rainbow Canyon drains the west slope of the Santa Rosa Hills and the east slope of the Inyo Mountains into the Panamint Valley.

Flight training
Rainbow Canyon was among the few places in the world (Mach Loop is another) where photographers can see combat aircraft flying below them. Military training flights had used the canyon since World War II. Observers could even see the pilots' facial expressions, who, aware of the audience, sometime gave gestures or other signals. The training area was most often used by fighters such as the F-15, F-18, and F-22, but also by bombers and at least once, a C-17 Globemaster cargo plane. Foreign combat aircraft such as the Israeli F-16I Sufa, Eurofighter Typhoon, and the Sukhoi Su-30 MKI have been photographed or filmed making passes through the canyon. Air bases that conducted low-altitude training at Rainbow Canyon include Nellis Air Force Base, Naval Air Station Lemoore, NAWC China Lake, Marine Corps Air Station Miramar, Fresno Air National Guard Base and Edwards Air Force Base. The airspace in the area is restricted to military training, designed to hone the pilots' skills at flying low and fast to avoid enemy radar and anti-aircraft fire. The area is within the Panamint Military operations area, part of the R-2508 Complex administered by Edwards. The R-2508 Complex handbook refers to the canyon as Star Wars Canyon and the path through the canyon connecting Owens Valley in the west and Panamint Valley in the east as Jedi Transition.

Star Wars Canyon "below-the-rim" activity was suspended in August 2019, after an accident killed a pilot and injured several tourists. The 22 May 2022 version of the R-2508 Complex handbook instructs aircraft: "Maintain a minimum of 1000' above the lip of Rainbow Canyon."

In January 2022, a Dassault Falcon 8X long-range business jet flew through the canyon below its lip, accompanied by another jet rigged with cameras.

Photography
Because Rainbow Canyon offers the rare opportunity of proximity to military jets in flight, the National Park Service has made it an attraction with informational signs and a parking lot, though training schedules are not available to the public and flights do not occur every day. The closest store and gas station are Panamint Springs Resort at the edge of Panamint Valley. Mobile phone service is not available in the area, and phone-based navigation generally does not work.

See also
Saline Valley

References

External links 

 R-2508 Complex: Edwards Air Force Base information about Rainbow Canyon pilot training
 R-2508 User's Handbook: May 23, 2022 (PDF)

AP Images

Canyons and gorges of California
Death Valley National Park
Geography of California
Low flying